The rufous-fronted tailorbird (Orthotomus frontalis) is a species of bird formerly placed in the Old World warbler assemblage, but now placed in the family Cisticolidae. It is native to the southern and eastern Philippines. Its natural habitats are subtropical or tropical moist lowland forests and subtropical or tropical mangrove forests.

References

rufous-fronted tailorbird
Birds of Mindanao
Endemic birds of the Philippines
rufous-fronted tailorbird
Taxonomy articles created by Polbot